The Philippine Hockey League (PHL) is the national ice hockey league in the Philippines which operates under regulations of the International Ice Hockey Federation (IIHF). The inaugural season started in October 2018.

The Philippine Minor Hockey League serves as the developmental league of the PHL.

Teams
The inaugural PHL season has featured four teams:

Manila Bearcats
Manila Chiefs
Philippine Eagles
Manila Lightning

Champions
2018–19: Manila Lightnings

References

Ice hockey competitions in the Philippines
Ice hockey leagues in Asia
Sports leagues in the Philippines
2018 establishments in the Philippines